Charles Morgan,  D.D. (24 September 1678 – 30 April 1736) was Master of Clare College from 1726 until his death.

Morgan was born in Covent Garden, London, and was educated at Clare College, Cambridge. He became a Fellow of the college in 1700.  He was ordained a priest in the Church of England in 1704. He held livings at Thurston, Suffolk and Glemsford. Morgan was Vice-Chancellor of the University of Cambridge between 1732 and 1733.

He died on 30 April 1736, in Cambridge.

References

Masters of Clare College, Cambridge
Fellows of Clare College, Cambridge
Alumni of Clare College, Cambridge
1736 deaths
1678 births
People from Covent Garden
18th-century English Anglican priests
Vice-Chancellors of the University of Cambridge